BKV may refer to:

 Bennett Kuhn Varner, a marketing agency based in Atlanta, Georgia, United States
 BK virus, a member of the polyomavirus family
 BKV Norrtälje, a football club based in Norrtälje, Sweden
 Brooksville–Tampa Bay Regional Airport, an airport in Florida, United States
 Budapesti Közlekedési Zrt., a public transport operator in Budapest, Hungary